The 1947 New Mexico Lobos football team represented the University of New Mexico in the Border Conference during the 1947 college football season.  In their first season under head coach Berl Huffman, the Lobos compiled a 4–5–1 record (1–5–1 against conference opponents), finished seventh in the Border Conference, and were outscored by opponents by a total of 182 to 171.

Berl Huffman was hired as the head football coach in March 1947. He had been an assistant coach at Texas Tech since 1935.

Schedule

References

New Mexico
New Mexico Lobos football seasons
New Mexico Lobos football